Wymysłów  (until December 31, 2005 with type of settlement as of hamlet of village of Rudniki) is a village in the administrative district of Gmina Połaniec, within Staszów County, Świętokrzyskie Voivodeship, in south-central Poland.

The village has a population of 90.

References

Villages in Staszów County